Charles Robinson Jr. (November 6, 1829 – July 30, 1891) was a Massachusetts politician who served as the eighth mayor of  Charlestown, Massachusetts. Robinson was the brother of Massachusetts Governor George D. Robinson.

Early life
Robinson was born in Lexington, Massachusetts to Charles and Mary (Davis) Robinson, on November 6, 1829.

Notes

1829 births
1891 deaths
Mayors of Charlestown, Massachusetts
Members of the Massachusetts House of Representatives
19th-century American politicians